Adam Jabiri (born 3 June 1984) is a German professional footballer who plays as a forward for 1. FC Schweinfurt 05.

Career statistics

Honours
Rot-Weiß Erfurt
 Thuringia Cup: 2007–08

1. FC Heidenheim
 Württemberg Cup: 2011–12

Würzburger Kickers
 3. Liga: Third place 2015–16 (promotion to 2. Bundesliga)
 Regionalliga Bayern: Champion 2014–15
 Bavarian Cup:  2015–16

1. FC Schweinfurt 05
 Regionalliga Bayern: Champion 2019–21
 Bavarian Cup:  2016–17,  2017–18
 Regionalliga Bayern top scorer: 2017–18 (28 goals)

References

External links
 

1984 births
Living people
Association football forwards
German footballers
FC Rot-Weiß Erfurt players
TSG 1899 Hoffenheim players
TSG 1899 Hoffenheim II players
1. FC Heidenheim players
Wormatia Worms players
Würzburger Kickers players
1. FC Schweinfurt 05 players
3. Liga players
Bundesliga players
Regionalliga players
People from Kitzingen
Sportspeople from Lower Franconia
Footballers from Bavaria